La Tosca Flats is a registered historic building in Cincinnati, Ohio, listed in the National Register on February 5, 1999.

Historic uses 
Multiple Dwelling

Notes

External links
National Register nomination form

National Register of Historic Places in Cincinnati